Joe Warham (1920 – 4 September 2013, Leeds, Yorkshire) was a rugby league footballer, coach and administrator, having been associated with Leeds Rugby League Football Club (now Leeds Rhinos) for more than fifty years.

Warham was born in Warrington, Lancashire, England. Under his stewardship, and assisted by Dai Prosser, in 1960/61 Leeds won their first-ever championship, beating Warrington 25–10 in the final at Odsal Stadium.

Joe later moved to head up Leeds' scouting and recruiting efforts, signing many of the players who formed the backbone of Leeds' very successful late 1960s, and 1970s side. As Roy Francis, coach in the mid-sixties, said later, with players that talented he had no need to coach or drill them – he sent them on to the pitch to play their natural game.

In 1969 Joe stepped up to coach Leeds again on an interim basis following Roy Francis' departure, and once again brought success, the club winning the championship for a second time.

In the seventies Joe served the club in a number of capacities, including scouting, organising players' testimonials and representing the club on various RL committees, before being made General Manager of the Company in 1980. His period of tenure saw a number of significant ground improvements at Headingley – including, on the Test cricket ground, the UK's first electronic cricket scoreboard. After leaving the board he served as president of Leeds' Taverners' Club and as President of Leeds' ex-players' association.

Coaching career
Joe Warham was the coach in Leeds' 25–10 victory over Warrington in the Championship Final during the 1960–61 season at Odsal Stadium, Bradford on Saturday 20 May 1961, in front of a crowd of 52,177.

References

External links
 Era of the Biff
 Hodgson, Phil; Headingley Heroes
 Leeds RL supporters' handbooks
 press reports
 Notice of death
CUP FINAL: Legend tells of split loyalties

1920 births
2013 deaths
British rugby league administrators
English rugby league coaches
English rugby league players
Leeds Rhinos coaches
Oldham R.L.F.C. players
Rochdale Hornets coaches
Rugby league players from Warrington
Rugby league wingers
Swinton Lions players